Jamba Isaac Ulengo (born 7 January 1990 in Vryburg, South Africa) is a South African rugby union player for the  in the Currie Cup. His regular position is wing.

Career

Youth and Varsity Cup rugby

He was chosen to represent the Free State at various youth levels while he was a scholar at Hoërskool Jim Fouché in Bloemfontein; in 2005 and 2006, he played at the Under-16 Grant Khomo Week tournaments, in 2007 he played at the Under-18 Academy Week tournament and in 2008 he played at the Under-18 Craven Week tournament.

Free State Cheetahs

Despite his long-standing involvement with the Free State youth sides, he made just a single appearance for the senior side. He was included in the  squad for the 2012 Currie Cup Premier Division, but didn't make any appearances for them.

Sevens

Ulengo was a prominent member of the South Africa Sevens since making his debut for them in the Scotland leg of the 2011–12 IRB Sevens World Series. He played for them in the two final tournaments of that season and then signed a two-year contract with the South African Rugby Union to represent them in the 2012–13 and 2013–14 series. While he only competed at four events in his first full season, he was involved in seven of the tournaments in his second season. He also helped South Africa win the gold medal at the 2013 World Games.

Bulls

References

South African rugby union players
Living people
1990 births
People from Vryburg
Rugby union wings
Free State Cheetahs players
South Africa international rugby sevens players
World Games gold medalists
Competitors at the 2013 World Games
South Africa international rugby union players
Blue Bulls players
Bulls (rugby union) players
Golden Lions players
Lions (United Rugby Championship) players
Rugby union players from North West (South African province)
Tel Aviv Heat players
South African expatriate sportspeople in Israel
South African expatriate rugby union players
Expatriate rugby union players in Israel
Griffons (rugby union) players